Alex Michael Wimmers (born November 1, 1988) is an American former professional baseball pitcher. He played in Major League Baseball (MLB) for the Minnesota Twins. He played college baseball at Ohio State.

Career

Amateur
Wimmers attended Archbishop Moeller High School in Cincinnati, Ohio, and Ohio State University, where he played college baseball for the Ohio State Buckeyes baseball team. In 2009, his sophomore year, he was named an All-American. After the 2009 season, he played collegiate summer baseball with the Bourne Braves of the Cape Cod Baseball League. He won the 2010 National Pitcher of the Year Award.

Minnesota Twins
The Twins drafted Wimmers in the first round, with the 21st overall selection, of the 2010 MLB Draft. He signed with the Twins, receiving a $1.332 million signing bonus.

On August 2, 2012, Wimmers underwent Tommy John surgery to repair a torn ulnar collateral ligament of elbow joint. He had made one start with the New Britain Rock Cats of the Class AA Eastern League and one with the Gulf Coast League Twins of the Rookie-level Gulf Coast League. He underwent elbow surgery in October 2013, but was healthy to start the 2014 season. He pitched for the Chattanooga Lookouts of the Class AA Southern League in 2015. He began the 2016 season with Chattanooga, and was promoted to the Rochester Red Wings of the Class AAA International League. The Twins promoted Wimmers to the major leagues on August 26. On November 9, he was outrighted to the minor leagues. During the 2016 offseason, Wimmers signed a new minor league contract with the Twins.

Miami Marlins
Wimmers began the 2017 season with Rochester. The Twins promoted him to the major leagues on June 1. On June 23, Wimmers was designated for assignment. After becoming a free agent at the end of the 2017 season, Wimmers signed a minor league contract with the Miami Marlins on December 15. He was released from the organization on June 4, 2018.

Sugar Land Skeeters
On June 29, 2018, Wimmers signed with the Sugar Land Skeeters of the Atlantic League of Professional Baseball. He became a free agent following the 2018 season.

References

External links

1988 births
Living people
Baseball players from Cincinnati
Major League Baseball pitchers
Minnesota Twins players
Ohio State Buckeyes baseball players
Bourne Braves players
Fort Myers Miracle players
Gulf Coast Twins players
New Britain Rock Cats players
Chattanooga Lookouts players
Rochester Red Wings players
New Orleans Baby Cakes players
Sugar Land Skeeters players